Beerburrum railway station is located on the North Coast line in Queensland, Australia. It serves the town of Beerburrum in the Sunshine Coast Region.

History

The North Coast line from Caboolture to Landsborough (which included a siding at Beerburrum) was completed on 1 February 1890.

Beerburrum station was originally a single platform with a crossing loop. As part of the construction of a new 14 kilometre alignment for the North Coast line from Caboolture to Beerburrum, a new station was built immediately to the east, opening on 14 April 2009. Beyond Beerburrum, the line becomes single track. It is scheduled to be duplicated to Landsborough by 2021.

Services
Beerburrum is serviced by City network services to Brisbane, Nambour and Gympie North. To relieve congestion on the single track North Coast line north of Beerburrum, the rail service is supplemented by a bus service operated by Kangaroo Bus Lines on weekdays between Caboolture and Nambour as route 649.

Services by platform

References

External links

Beerburrum station Queensland Rail
Beerburrum station Queensland's Railways on the Internet

North Coast railway line, Queensland
Railway stations in Sunshine Coast, Queensland